Blue Selection is the studio album by Japanese singer-songwriter Yōsui Inoue, released shortly after its predecessor Cassis.

Like The Night Without a Guide album came out in 1992, it includes renewed renditions of his previous released songs. Those interpretations features the jazz-influence arrangements, and they were recorded by his then-touring band.

The lead-off track "Kazari ja Nai no yo Namida wa" was released as a single prior to the album, but it was almost disregarded. Likewise, Blue Selection itself managed to reach the top-20 on the chart, and has been one of the least successful albums for Inoue.

Track listing
All songs written and composed by Yōsui Inoue, unless otherwise noted
"" - 4:05
"" (Inoue/Natsumi Hirai) - 4:45
"" - 3:57
"" - 4:58
"Canary" - 4:58
"" - 5:55
"Final Love Song" - 5:17
"" - 4:05
"" - 6:06
"" (Inoue/Katz Hoshi) - 4:39
"" - 5:51

Chart positions

Album

Single

Release history

References

2002 albums
Yōsui Inoue albums